Myslina is a village and municipality in Humenné District in the Prešov Region of north-east Slovakia.

History
In historical records the village was first mentioned in 1307.

Geography
The municipality lies at an altitude of 190 metres and covers an area of 9.542 km2.
It has a population of about 560 people.

External links
 
http://www.statistics.sk/mosmis/eng/run.html

Villages and municipalities in Humenné District